Paul Reuter (1911–1990) was "one of the twentieth century's greatest specialists on international law" and the principal architect of the legal framework for the European Coal and Steel Community,  the first in a series of institutions that would ultimately become the European Union.

Biography

Early years
Paul Reuter was born on 12 February 1911 in Metz, which at that time was part of the German Empire, but reverted to France at the end of World War I. He served in the French Forces during World War II.

Academic career
Reuter obtained the title of Agrégé de droit in 1928, and in 1933 was awarded his Doctor of Laws at the University of Nancy.   He began his long teaching career at the University of Nancy in the mid-1930s and was later on the university law faculties of Poitiers, Aix-en-Provence, Paris, and the Graduate Institute for International Studies in Geneva.

Oxford University Press's Encyclopaedic Dictionary of International Law (EDIL) lists Reuter's principal works as:

- Droit International public (5th ed. 1976),

- Institutions internationals (8th ed. 1965),

- Institutions et relations internationals (2nd ed. 1988),

- Introduction au droit des traités (3rd ed. 1990).

His book on the law of treaties (Introduction au droit des traités) is viewed as a "classic" work. This volume, and Reuter's book on international organizations (Institutions internationals) "are regarded as authoritative by academic and government circles alike." Further, Reuter's 1953 book on the European Coal and Steel Community (Communauté Européen du Charbon et de l'Acier) is the EDIL's recommended source on the institutions and structure of the European Community.

Government Advisor, and role in the creation of the European Coal and Steel Community
After the war, Reuter held senior positions in the French Ministries of Information, Justice, and National Defence, and he was a long-time adviser to the French Ministry of Foreign Affairs.  Reuter's input and expertise in international and public law was instrumental in the drafting of the Schuman Declaration and the Treaty of Paris (1951), which led to the creation of the European Coal and Steel Community (ECSC). The ECSC laid the foundation for the 1958 establishment of the European Economic Community, the forerunner of the European Union.

Judicial career
Reuter was a member of the International Law Commission of the United Nations from 1964 to 1989.

He represented France before the Court of Justice of the European Communities and the European Court of Human Rights.

As "one of the great international law minds of the world", Reuter was much in demand in international adjudications and arbitrations.

Honours and awards
In 1981, Reuter was awarded the Balzan Prize for his work in International Public Law.  The Balzan Prize is "one of the most prestigious international awards in natural science and humanities" and, in 2020, was worth 750,000 Swiss francs (about $800,000 US dollars.)

During 1985 and 1986, Reuter was President of the Nobel Peace Prize-winning Institute of International Law (Institut de Droit International).

In 1986 Reuter received the World Academy of Art & Science Rufus Jones Award for Contributions to World Peace and International Understanding.

Death and legacy
Paul Reuter died on 29 April 1990 at the age of 79.

The construction of Europe owes much to Professor Reuter, according to Honorary President of the French Society for International Law, Alain Pellet.  He believes "It was not exaggeration to say that, without him, the European Communities would not have appeared in their present form, or would have been established only much later."

Also, Reuter's contribution to the modern law of treaties and the law of international organizations will leave "indelible imprints on legal history" according to Bola Ajibola, speaking on behalf of the African country members of the UN's International Law Commission.  Ajibola noted Reuter aspired to make international law "free from injustice and intended to serve the interest of both developed and developing counties, while protecting the weak from the strong."

A donation by Reuter in 1981 enabled the International Committee of the Red Cross (ICRC) to establish the Paul Reuter Prize to encourage research in, and the promotion of, international humanitarian law.

See also 

European Coal and Steel Community

Schuman Declaration

International Committee of the Red Cross

Balzan Prize

External links 

 Schuman Declaration
 Paul Reuter Prize

References 

1911 births
1990 deaths
20th-century French lawyers
Members of the International Law Commission